I tomteverkstan, released on 19 November 2001, is a Christmas album from Swedish "dansband" Lasse Stefanz. It was released to CD and cassette tape The song "Ute på vischan" was on Svensktoppen from December 2001 to January 2002.

Track listing
Jag vill hem till julen
Blue Christmas
Ett rött paket med vita snören om
Lonely this Christmas
Ute på vischan
Rocking around the Christmas Tree
Knallejul
A Very Merry Rocking Good Christmas
Vår vackra vita vintervärld
Rolf ren
Silent Night
Juletid
Tänd ett ljus
Utan dej så blir det ingen jul

References 

2001 Christmas albums
Lasse Stefanz albums
Christmas albums by Swedish artists
Country Christmas albums